The 2007 European Cup Winter Throwing was held on 17 and 18 March at Avangard Stadium in Yalta, Ukraine. It was the seventh edition of the athletics competition for throwing events organised by the European Athletics Association. A total of 203 athletes from 26 countries entered the competition – a new high for the event.

Summary
The competition featured men's and women's contests in shot put, discus throw, javelin throw and hammer throw. In addition to the senior competitions, there were also under-23 events for younger athletes.

Athletes in the senior competitions were seeded into "A" and "B" groups. Igor Sukhomlinov of Russia surprised with a personal best of 83.34 m in the javelin throw to win the title despite being seeded in the "B" group. Dzimitry Hancharuk, Chiara Rosa, Nataliya Semenova were other "B" group athletes to take a medal, each of them a bronze.

Two national records were broken during the competition: men's discus throw bronze medallist Ercüment Olgundeniz improved the Turkish record to 64.34 metres, while under-23 athlete Melik Janoyan set a new Armenian best for the javelin with his throw of 69.34 metres.

Several athletes went on to take top honours at the 2007 World Championships in Athletics. Discus winners Gerd Kanter and Franka Dietzsch became world champions, while the men's hammer throwers Primož Kozmus and Ivan Tsikhan took the top two spots in Osaka as they did in Yalta.

Medal winners

Senior

Under-23

Medal and points table

Participation

References

Results
7th European Cup Winter Throwing Results. RFEA. Retrieved on 2013-11-16.
Results (archived). Yalta 2007. Retrieved on 2013-11-16.
ECp-w  Yalta  UKR  17 - 18 March  Throws 7th European Winter Throwing Cup. Tilastopaja. Retrieved on 2013-11-16.

External links
Official website (archived)

2007
2007 in athletics (track and field)
2007 in European sport
2007 in Ukrainian sport
Sport in Yalta
International athletics competitions hosted by Ukraine
Sports competitions in Crimea